Surfeit locus protein 4 or Surf4 is a protein involved in regulating export of some proteins from the endoplasmic reticulum to the golgi bodies. Surf4 is involved in trafficking soluble (i.e. non-membrane-bound) proteins, namely lipoproteins and PCSK9. It recognizes cargo proteins via a three-amino-acid sequence near the N-termini. The related protein in yeast is called Erv29p.

This gene is named based on its location in the surfeit gene cluster, composed of six housekeeping genes that do not share sequence similarity. The encoded protein is a conserved integral membrane protein containing multiple putative transmembrane regions. Surf4's yeast homolog is directly required for packaging glycosylated pro-alpha-factor into COPII vesicles.

Eliminating Surf4 in the liver reduces the amount of lipid in the plasma and prevents atherosclerosis in mice.

References